Al-Mustakfi I, (23 March 1285 – February 1340) was the third Abbasid caliph seated in Cairo under the Mamluk Sultanate between 1302 and 1340.

Life 
In his reign opened the island of Arwad on the coast of the Levant opposite the city of Tartus (Tartous today), and saved from the hands of the Crusaders Gang, the last of their positions in the Levant. In the second half of the month of Sha'ban of the same year (702 AH) the princes began to arrive from Egypt, and the tatar groups began to flow towards the country. Bilad al-Sham, the army fled from Aleppo and Hama towards Damascus, and the Tatars arrived in Homs and Baalbek, and met Sheikh Islam Ibn Taymiyah with the soldiers of Hama fleeing in Qatifah.
Al-Assaker came out of Damascus on 24 Shaban and camped in Al-Kaswa, in order to avoid the city of Damascus, the desolation and the assault on children and the disabled men and the women's captivity, and because the lawn was too much water at that time is not suitable for fighting. The armies came from Egypt and met with the people of Sham in the area of Al-Kaswa, and at the head of these armies the Caliph Al-Mustaqf and Sultan Al-Nasir Muhammad ibn Qalawun. On the second Saturday of Ramadan, these armies met in Marj Al-Safar. He asked the people of Damascus to protect the walls and maintain security and cling to the citadel.

References

Bibliography

 

1340 deaths
Cairo-era Abbasid caliphs
14th-century Abbasid caliphs
Year of birth unknown
1285 births
Sons of Abbasid caliphs